The F23 is a five-speed manual transmission manufactured by Getrag in Italy. It is designed for transverse engine applications, primarily by General Motors.

The F23 has one roll pin, two gearsets on each of three parallel shafts – the input shaft, the output shaft, and the intermediate shaft. This three-shaft (also called three-axis) design results in a very short axial length for better packaging. There are three separate shift fork shafts, which hold three shift forks to activate the synchronizer rings for the two gearsets on each of the three gear shafts. The shift forks are activated by a cable system. The clutch release bearing is operated by a concentric slave cylinder that surrounds the input shaft in the clutch housing. A concentric slave cylinder allows more linear clutch feel than an external lever-actuated clutch and release bearing. The input shaft carries the 3rd and 4th gear synchronizer, the intermediate shaft carries the 1st and 2nd gear synchronizer, and the output shaft carries the 5th and reverse gear synchronizer. The aluminium case contains a conventional final drive gearset.

There are sintered bronze double-cone blocker rings on the synchronizers for 1st and 2nd gears, while 3rd and 4th gears use carbon fiber blocker rings, and 5th and Reverse gears use molybdenum on their synchronizers. Carbon and molybdenum are extremely durable friction surfaces that remain stable even under extreme heat.

In the U.S. market, General Motors uses the F23 in two versions (with several application variations): the M86/M94 and MG3.

There is now an aftermarket source for limited slip differentials, of the helical-gear, torque-sensing / torque-biasing design.

It also has a following in the ecotec racing community for being able to handle 700 hp with an LSD insert and only costing about $200. It does not have the problems that plague the F-35 found in the SS, so it makes for a good transmission swap candidate.

Gear ratios

M86/M94

Applications

2000–2005 Chevrolet Cavalier
2000–2005 Pontiac Sunfire
2000–2005 Pontiac Grand Am
2000–2004 Saturn Vue

f23

2005–2008 Chevrolet Cobalt
2009–2010 Chevrolet Cobalt (economy package 3.63:1 FDR is RPO FY1)
2005–2007 Pontiac G5
2003–2007 Saturn Ion
Opel Corsa
Opel Astra
2000–2002 Opel Vectra B
Opel Combo
Opel Zafira
Opel Tigra
Opel Speedster
Saturn L-series

f23

2005–2008 Chevrolet HHR
2009–2010 Chevrolet HHR is 3.95:1 FDRr.

MG3

Applications

2002–2007 Saturn Vue

Mechanical Faults

Rattling / Grinding
On 28 January 2002, General Motors released a Technical Service Bulletin (TSB #02-07-29-001) addressing a "Grinding/Rattle Type Noise Coming From Transmission". The TSB was intended for the following GM vehicles equipped with the GM Quad 4 (RPO LD9) Engine and Getrag M86/M94 5-Speed Transmissions:

2000–2002 Chevrolet Cavalier
2000–2001 Oldsmobile Alero
2000–2002 Pontiac Sunfire
2000–2001 Pontiac Grand Am

The bulletin continued to explain that there are actually two distinguishable noises which have two very different remedies.

Noise 1: This is a very distinct noise that is usually much louder than the second noise that can be associated with this transmission. If the vehicle is not making any noise when trying to verify the condition, it can be induced by making several tight left hand circles with the vehicle at normal operating temperature.

Making a sharp right hand turn will usually stop the noise. While the noise is occurring, in order to distinguish between the two noises, you can press lightly on the clutch pedal without releasing the clutch and the noise will NOT go away or change. As a second diagnostic aid, while the vehicle is making the noise, shift to third gear and the noise will stop.

Noise 2: This noise, commonly referred to as gear rattle, can be induced by lugging the engine in any gear, but is usually most noticeable in first or second gear. While the noise is occurring, if you press lightly on the clutch pedal without releasing the clutch, the noise will be reduced or eliminated.

General Motors provided a fix for "Noise #1" but stated that "Noise #2" was a characteristic of any car equipped with a manual transmission and that a similar noise could be repeated by lugging the engine. The remedy for "Noise #1" was to overfill the transmission with Saturn Manual Transmission Lubricant from the stock 1.8 quarts to 2.6 quarts. Although this seemed to work for many customers, many other complaints still surfaced and in 2003 General Motors released another TSB urging customers that still have the rattling noise in their transmissions should bring their vehicles in to their nearest General Motors affiliated dealer for a more complex fix. This time, GM Technicians had concluded that gears one and two required additional thrust loads and proceeded to install a wave washer between the blocking ring and speed gears for gears three and four. This indeed fixed the rattle issue once and for all, but has more recently been lamented in many online communities as causing a bigger problem than it solves, as many customers that received this fix reported third and fourth gears grinding from time to time while shifting. Afterwards, many owners of these vehicles have concluded that leaving the transmission alone was for the best, as the rattling noise has been proven to be harmless.

References 

Automotive transmission technologies
General Motors transmissions
F23